Henri "Heng" Freylinger (23 September 1926 – 17 January 2017) was a Luxembourgian wrestler. He competed in the Greco-Roman welterweight event at the 1952 Summer Olympics.

References

1926 births
2017 deaths
Luxembourgian male sport wrestlers
Olympic wrestlers of Luxembourg
Wrestlers at the 1952 Summer Olympics
People from Schuttrange